Woolmers Park is a Grade II* listed building in Hertfordshire, England. It was the residence of Claude Bowes-Lyon, 14th Earl of Strathmore and Kinghorne and Cecilia Bowes-Lyon, Countess of Strathmore and Kinghorne in the 1920s. It was acquired by Arthur Lucas in 1949, and the Hertfordshire Polo Club was established within the grounds.

References

Buildings and structures in Hertfordshire